Amar Sangee is a 1987 Indian Bengali-language film directed by Sujit Guha and  produced by Dipti Pal. The film features actors Prosenjit Chatterjee and Vijayeta Pandit in the lead roles. The musics of the film was composed by Bappi Lahiri.

Plot 
Sagar is a young man from a rich family whose father Indranil is a very prominent businessman. Sagar goes off to pursue his education and after he returns home he meets a pretty young lady called Jhilik, who was a childhood friend. They meet and they fall in love. When Sagar's father finds out about their relationship he refuses to accept it because Jhilik is the daughter of Anuradha, their maid. Indranil wants his son to marry his friend's daughter Tumpa instead. Tumpa's brother Suvankar also wants his sister to marry Sagar as he has designs on the properties of Indranil & Sagar. When all his plans fail, Suvankar attempts to kill Indranil by sabotaging his car. In the meantime, Sagar finds out about this and saves his father. Later Suvankar is handed over to the police for his crime. Eventually Indranil realizes his mistakes and relents to have Jhilik as his daughter-in-law. In the end Jhilik and Sagar are re-united.

Cast
 Prosenjit Chatterjee as Sagar
 Vijayeta Pandit as Jhilik
 Subhendu Chatterjee as Indranil 
 Ruma Guha Thakurta as Anuradha 
 Shakuntala Barua as Sagar's Mother
 Rabi Ghosh
 Haradhan Banerjee
 Ishani Banerjee as Tumpa
 Soumitra Bannerjee as Shubhankar
 Bhabesh Kundu

Soundtrack

Awards

|-
| 1988
| Asha Bhosle
| BFJA Awards For Best Playback Singer (Female) 
| 
|}

References

1987 films
Bengali-language Indian films
Films set in Kolkata
Films scored by Bappi Lahiri
1980s Bengali-language films
Films directed by Sujit Guha